Enemmy is a 2013 Indian Hindi-language action thriller film directed by  Ashu Trikha - the title being intentionally misspelt using the 6 main characters initials. The film stars Mithun Chakraborty, Sunil Shetty, Mahakshay Chakraborty, Kay Kay Menon, Johnny Lever, Zakir Hussain and Yuvika Chaudhary. and Deepraj Rana

Plot

Enemmy follows daredevil CID officers tracking an underworld don.

Six undercover cops officers Eklavya Karmarkar, Naeem Shaikh, Madhav Sinha and Eric Collaco and Pakya Seth and Yugandhar Vishnoi get the assignment to stop a gang war over a missing sum of money. They manage to put the underworld don Mukhtar Memon behind the bars, but that doesn't solve the problem. Later, a senior CBI Officer Yugandhar Vishnoi, starts investigating the case.

Cast
 Mithun Chakraborty as Yugandhar Vishnoi, a Central Bureau Investigation Department Officer
 Sunil Shetty as Eklavya Karmarkar / Bhau , a Criminal Investigation Department Officer
 Kay Kay Menon as Naeem Shaikh, a Criminal Investigation Department Officer 
 Johnny Lever as Eric Collaco, a Criminal Investigation Department Officer
 Mahakshay Chakraborty as Madhav Sinha aka Maddy, a Criminal Investigation Department Officer 
 Zakir Hussain as Mukhtar Memon, the Underworld don (as the Killer of Pakya and Naeem)  
 Yuvika Chaudhary as Priya Shaikh, Naeem's wife
 Priyanka Upendra as Pooja Karmarkar, Eklavya's wife
 Akshay Kapoor as Chief Minister Ram Govardhan alias "CMRG" (Politician)
 Mumaith Khan as item number "Katrina Ko Kareena Ko"
 Deepraj Rana as Pakya Seth ,  Criminal Investigation Department Informer 
 Sharat Saxena as "Raghu" Raghunath Pandey

Soundtrack 
Soundtrack was composed by Bappi Lahiri and Gourav Dasgupta.

Reception
Johnson Thomas of the Free Press Journal said the film was "shot in the old-fashioned style reminiscent of the late 80's Bollywoodian pot-boilers" with a "stupidly revelatory plotting" and  performances that are "all quite unattractive to say the least".

References

External links
 
 

2013 films
2010s Hindi-language films
Indian action thriller films
2013 action thriller films
Films directed by Ashu Trikha